Fatkat Animation was an animation studio located in Miramichi, New Brunswick.

History
The company was formed from animators who left Helix Animation in 1999. It was owned and operated by Gene Fowler and his employees. This company was started in Halifax, Nova Scotia, and was taken over by Trainingscape, which saw the creation of over 40 training films for various companies, but as of 2009, it's now known as Oasis Animation.

In the winter of 2003, Trainingscape disbanded and that was when Fowler decided to move Fatkat to his hometown of Miramichi, New Brunswick. Fatkat worked on the film Curious George (2006), television shows such as Happy Tree Friends, Caillou (season 3 only), Carl², Family Guy, Odd Job Jack, Skunk Fu!, Supernormal, Chaotic, Jimmy Two-Shoes, and Three Delivery. They had major clients such as I Can't Believe It's Not Butter!, Pepsi, Microsoft, and Toyota.

Setbacks
Fatkat was, at one point, considered the largest animation studio in Atlantic Canada and the fastest growing animation studio in Canada. However, after government funding for the studio dried up under the Harper government, the 2007-2010 economic crisis occurred and the fact that the business plan didn't actually set a goal of making money, Fatkat eventually dwindled until its closure was announced in May 2009.

At the time of closure, the company was down to employing only 3 people, even though it had received $1 million in government grants since 2005 under the government.

2009–present 
Fowler formed a much smaller successor studio Loogaroo in Miramichi, New Brunswick, despite the fact that he had declared insolvency with Fatkat Animation.

References

External links 
 Loogaroo animation studio
 Previous official site for Fatkat

Canadian animation studios
Mass media in Miramichi, New Brunswick
Adult animation studios
Buildings and structures in Miramichi, New Brunswick
Mass media companies established in 1999
Mass media companies disestablished in 2009
1999 establishments in New Brunswick